Michigan Railway may refer to:
Michigan Railway (electric), operators of Michigan United Railways lines until 1921
Michigan Railway (1880), predecessor of the Grand Trunk Western Railroad